This is a complete list of Estonia international footballers – association football players who have played for the Estonia national football team.

Players
Updated as of 12 January 2023.

See also
List of Estonia women's international footballers

References

External links
 

 
Association football player non-biographical articles